The Carl Barks Collection is a series of books from the Disney licensee Egmont containing all Disney comics and covers written and/or drawn by Carl Barks, collected in chronological order. It also includes significant textual materials (articles and analysis) written by editor Geoffrey Blum.

Publication 
It was published from 2005 to 2008 in Denmark, Norway, Sweden, and Germany. It was also published by Sanoma in Finland, although one year after the other countries. The complete set consists of 30 books collected in 10 slipcase boxes, constituting about 8,000 pages (including the articles) or some 500 comic book stories by Barks. The series was only available by subscription. In many aspects the series is similar to Carl Barks Library (CBL) but differs by being published in colour, organizing the stories by date of publication, using only unchanged artwork and containing material not used in CBL, much of it newly discovered and previously unpublished. Blum was a contributing editor to CBL, and his familiarity with the Barks canon and its historic background is the principal reason Egmont hired him. Blum has drawn not only on material that appeared previously in CBL but new research he has undertaken which has resulted in a number of significant discoveries and fresh perspectives on Barks and his creations.

A similar edition was published in Spain, by Planeta deAgostini. It differed from the other editions by not having Blum's articles (having, instead, articles signed by the Barks specialist Alfons Moliné), it was smaller and not in boxes, and it was sold through comic book shops. A book was published approximately every three months, but the collection was stopped after volume 4.

In Norway, a six-volume follow-up series called Carl Barks Ekstra was published 2009–2012. It contains the most of Barks's works outside his Disney comics production. The last four volumes were also published in Sweden, and the last book with paintings and drawings was published in Norway, Sweden, Germany, and Finland.

Editions

Volumes

Other collections 
Collections of Carl Barks' Disney comics have been published in the United States in The Carl Barks Library and The Complete Carl Barks Disney Library, in France in La dynastie Donald Duck - Intégrale Carl Barks (24 volumes planned), in Italy in La grande dinastia dei paperi (48 volumes), in Brazil in As Obras Completas de Carl Barks (41 volumes) and Coleção Carl Barks Definitiva (Brazilian edition of The Complete Carl Barks Disney Library), and in Greece in Η μεγάλη βιβλιοθήκη του Καρλ Μπαρκς (discontinued after 16 of the 48 planned volumes) and Η Μεγάλη Βιβλιοθήκη Disney (48 volumes).

See also
Carl Barks Library
The Complete Carl Barks Disney Library
List of Disney comics by Carl Barks
List of non-Disney comics by Carl Barks

References

External links
webpage of Geoffrey Blum

2005 comics debuts
Donald Duck comics by Carl Barks
Donald Duck
Disney comics titles